Bharatpur Division is one of the administrative geographical unit, called a division,  of Rajasthan state, India. The division comprises four districts, namely, Bharatpur, Dholpur, Karauli, Sawai Madhopur.

 
Divisions of Rajasthan